The 1961–62 season was FC Steaua București's 14th season since its founding in 1947.

For this season, the club's name changed once again, after 11 years under the name CCA, it changed to CSA Steaua București (Clubul Sportiv al Armatei Steaua – Army Sports Club Steaua), shorted as Steaua București. This name marks the club's history, under which it makes great performances though becoming one of the Europe's grands.

Divizia A

League table

Results

Cupa României

Results

European Cup

Preliminary round

See also

 1961–62 European Cup
 1961–62 Cupa României
 1961–62 Divizia A

Notes and references

External links
 1961–62 FC Steaua București Divizia A matches

FC Steaua București seasons
1961–62 in Romanian football
Steaua, București
Steaua